John Henry is a 1931 novel by Roark Bradford and illustrated by woodcut artist J. J. Lankes, based on the African-American folk hero of the same name.  It was made into a Broadway play and later a musical featuring Paul Robeson in the title role and Ruby Elzy as Julie Anne.

Quotes
"Show me the machine I can beat it"

References

See also

John Henry musical

1931 American novels
Novels by Roark Bradford
Harper & Brothers books